John Pell may refer to:
 John Pell (mathematician), English mathematician and political agent
 Sir John Pell (landowner), his son, British-born American landowner
 John H. Pell, member of the Minnesota State Senate